The Kite is an American sailboat that was designed by Carter Pyle as a one design racer and first built in 1965.

Production
The design was built by Newport Boats in Newport Beach, California and Mobjack Manufacturing Corp. in Gloucester, Virginia starting in 1965, but it is now out of production.

Design

The Kite is a recreational sailing dinghy, built predominantly of fiberglass. It has a single sail catboat rig, a slightly raked stem, an angled transom, a transom-hung rudder controlled by a tiller and a daggerboard. It displaces .

For sailing the design is equipped with boom vang and a center-boom-mounted mainsheet.

Operational history
The boat was at one time supported by a class club that organized racing events, the Kite Class, but it is now inactive.

See also
List of sailing boat types

References

External links

Dinghies
1960s sailboat type designs
Sailboat types built in the United States
Sailboat type designs by Carter Pyle
Sailboat types built by Newport Boats
Sailboat types built by Mobjack Manufacturing